Cheilomenes lunata is a species of ladybird. It was described by Johan Christian Fabricius in 1775.

References

Beetles described in 1775
Taxa named by Johan Christian Fabricius
Coccinellidae